The Greek national ice hockey team is the national ice hockey team of Greece and as an associate member of the International Ice Hockey Federation (IIHF) that competed in Division III of the IIHF World Championships. Greece are unable to compete in IIHF tournaments at present because they cannot fulfill the minimum standard of having one operational "Olympic size" indoor rink. They last competed in 2013.

History
Ice hockey started in Greece in 1984 by players that returned to Greece from abroad. The first official Greek Championship was held in 1989 at the Peace and Friendship Stadium with five teams taking place. It was the first time that ice hockey games were held in an official-size rink in the country. In 1990, the first junior national team was formed and took part in the World Junior Championship Pool C, held in Yugoslavia. In 1991, the junior national team took part in the World Junior Championship, held in Italy. In 1992, the first ever men's national team was formed and took place in the World Championships Pool C2 held in South Africa. With only two weeks of serious training abroad and the support of the Greeks of South Africa, the men's national team finished ahead of three other new hockey nations, winning the Bronze medal, placing them 29th overall.

Despite the great achievement, the start of the decline of the sport came in 1993. Economic help was discontinued by the Greek Undersecretary of State for Sports and all expenses to keep ice hockey alive were passed over to the players. Practices stopped and many players quit.

Since May 2003, the last ice rink in Greece closed and the national team was left without an ice rink. In the next 4 years, players of the national team traveled at their own expense in the Czech Republic in order to train themselves. Unfortunately, the IIHF determined in 2013 that the team will not be able to participate in any World Championship programs until an Olympic sized ice rink is constructed in the country.

Ice hockey was slowly dying until Dimitris Kalyvas (currently the captain of Team Greece) tried to convince the International Ice Hockey Federation (IIHF) that the National Team is still active and that development of the sport is continuing in the country despite not having an ice rink. He later received the support of the Hellenic Ice Sports Federation. After many emails, the IIHF decided to send 2 delegates to Athens to investigate. After a review by the IIHF in 2008, Greece retained its status within the IIHF, and took part in a qualification tournament against Armenia and Bosnia-Herzegovina in Sarajevo prior to the 2008 Division III championship in Luxembourg. They defeated both teams, beating Armenia 8 – 5 (although Armenia was forced to forfeit each game 5 – 0), and Bosnia-Herzegovina 10 – 1. They took part in Division III from 2008 until 2013, highlighted by a second-place finish in their group (third overall) in 2010.

2013 World Championship Division III

World Championship record

All-time Record against other nations
As of April 21, 2013

Note: Greece was awarded a 5–0 victory over Armenia in the 2008 IIHF World Championship Division III Qualification after Armenia forfeited the game due to player eligibility issues. The score of the game was originally an 8–5 for Greece.

All-time Record against other clubs
As of December 15, 2007

2010 World Championship
The Greece national ice hockey team competed in the 2010 IIHF World Championship Division III which was held in Luxembourg from April 14- April 17. The team was successful in winning the silver medal; gold went to Ireland and the host country Luxembourg won bronze

1992 Men's World Ice Hockey Championships Group C2
Here are the Results of Team Greece's first medal winning championship in 1992.

Qualification-

References

External links
Official website 
IIHF profile
National Teams of Ice Hockey
ICE HOCKEY IN GREECE
 ΧΟΚΕΫ ΕΠΙ ΠΑΓΟΥ ΣΤΗΝ ΕΛΛΑΔΑ

 
 
National ice hockey teams in Europe